The 18th Assembly District of Wisconsin is one of 99 districts in the Wisconsin State Assembly.  Located in southeast Wisconsin, the district is entirely contained within the boundaries of the city of Milwaukee in central Milwaukee County.  It comprises neighborhoods of Milwaukee's west side, including Washington Heights and Sherman Park.  It includes landmarks such as the Miller Brewing Company and Washington Park.  The district is represented by Democrat Evan Goyke, since January 2013.

The 18th Assembly district is located within Wisconsin's 6th Senate district, along with the 16th and 17th Assembly districts.

History

The district was created in the 1972 redistricting act (1971 Wisc. Act 304) which first established the numbered district system, replacing the previous system which allocated districts to specific counties.  The 18th district was drawn within the city of Milwaukee's north side with novel boundaries—the new district's boundaries did not resemble any Milwaukee County assembly district from the pre-1972 scheme, and contained pieces of four different districts from that map (the 1st, 6th, 7th, and 13th).  The last representative of the Milwaukee 6th district, Lloyd Barbee, was elected the first representative of the new 18th Assembly district in the 1972 election.

The district has remained in the same vicinity, but has crept slightly south and west in redistrictings since 1972. Though, with the exception of the court-ordered 1982 redistricting, which stretched the district into West Allis and Greenfield, it has otherwise remained entirely within the city limits of Milwaukee on the north side of Interstate 94.

List of past representatives

References 

Wisconsin State Assembly districts
Milwaukee County, Wisconsin